The Kluskus First Nation  is the band government of the Lhoosk’uz (from Lhooz – meaning ″white fish″ and k’uz – meaning ″half/side of″; "the half or side of the white fish is white"), a Dakelh people whose main reserve located on the Chilcotin Plateau 130 km west of the city of Quesnel, British Columbia, Canada.  The First Nation is a member of the Carrier-Chilcotin Tribal Council, which includes both Tsilhqot'in and Carrier (Dakelh) communities (the Kluskus First Nation is Carrier).

The Kluskus First Nation's offices are located in Quesnel.

Indian Reserves

There are several Indian Reserves under the administration of the Kluskus First Nation:

Bishop Bluffs Indian Reserve No. 10, 6 mi. E of Kluskus Lake, 48.60 ha. 
Bishop Bluffs Indian Reserve No. 5, 7 mi. SE of Kluskus Lake],] 64.80 ha. 
Bishop Bluffs Indian Reserve No. 6, 7 miles E of Kluskus Lake, 194.20 ha. 
Chief Morris Indian Reserve No. 13, 5 miles E of Kluskus Lake, 129.50 ha. 
Cluchuta Lake Indian Reserve No. 10A, on right (S) bank of the West Road River, 3 miles N of Cluchuta Lake, 64.80 ha. 
Cluchuta Lake Indian Reserve No. 10B, on right (S) bank of the West Road River, west end of and adjoining IR. No. 10A, 4.5 ha. 
Kloyadingli Indian Reserve No. 2, E end of the eastern Kluskus Lake, 221.70 ha. 
Kluskus Indian Reserve No. 1, W end of the N shore of the middle Kluskus Lake, 425.30 ha. 
Kluskus Indian Reserve No. 14, 5 Mi. E of the easterly Kluskus Lake, 48.60 ha. 
Kushya Creek Indian Reserve No. 12, 3 mi. W of Kluskus Lake, 16.20 ha. 
Kushya Creek Indian Reserve No. 7, 3 mi. W of West Kluskus Lake, 64.70 ha. 
Sundayman's Meadow Indian Reserve No. 3, on a creek flowing into Lower Kluskus Lake, 3 mi. E of Middle Euchiniko Lake, 32.40 ha. 
Tatelkus Lake Indian Reserve No. 28, at north end of Tatelkuz Lake, 125.80 ha. 
Tsachla Lake Indian Reserve No. 8, on S shore of Tsacha Lake, 64.30 ha. 
Tzetzi Lake Indian Reserve No. 11, on the West Road River, north shore of Blue (Tzetzi) Lake, 64.70 ha. 
Upper Kluskus Lake Indian Reserve No. 9, on N shore of Upper Kluskus Lake, 7.40 ha. 
Yaladelassla Indian Reserve No. 4, N shore of the easterly Euchiniko Lake, 70 ha.

See also
Dakelh
Carrier language
Carrier-Chilcotin Tribal Council
Tsilhqot'in Tribal Council
Carrier-Sekani Tribal Council

References

Dakelh governments
Chilcotin Country